Domart-sur-la-Luce is a commune in the Somme department in Hauts-de-France in northern France.

Geography

Population

History
Domart is sited on an old Roman road, known as the ‘chaussée d'Agrippa’ (Agrippa way), named after the general and politician. The road ran between Amiens and Noyon.
Known from writings of 1105, the first seigneur of Domart appears in 1154, called Ibert or Aubert. His château, now all but disappeared, was home to the seigneurs of Domart until the end of the 18th century, as well as to the Princes of Savoy.

At the time of the French Revolution, there were nearly 700 inhabitants of Domart.
As with so many villages in this area of France, Domart was practically destroyed during World War I.

See also
Communes of the Somme department

References

Communes of Somme (department)